USS Peggy (SP-1058) was a United States Navy patrol vessel in commission from 1917 to 1918.

Peggy was built as a private motorboat of the same name in 1914 or 1915 by Vanderslice at Camden, New Jersey. On 14 August 1917, the U.S. Navy acquired her from her owner,  G. F. Dieser of Philadelphia, Pennsylvania, for use as a section patrol boat during World War I. She was commissioned the same day as USS Peggy (SP-1072).

Assigned to the 4th Naval District and based at Philadelphia, Peggy conducted patrols for the rest of World War I.

The Navy returned Peggy to Dieser on 23 November 1918.

Notes

References

SP-1072 Peggy at Department of the Navy Naval History and Heritage Command Online Library of Selected Images: U.S. Navy Ships -- Listed by Hull Number: "SP" #s and "ID" #s -- World War I Era Patrol Vessels and other Acquired Ships and Craft numbered from SP-1000 through SP-1099
NavSource Online: Section Patrol Craft Photo Archive Peggy (SP 1072)

Patrol vessels of the United States Navy
World War I patrol vessels of the United States
Ships built in Camden, New Jersey
1914 ships
1915 ships